Merefield Ground was a cricket ground in Rochdale, Lancashire. Located alongside Merefield Road, the first recorded match played at the ground came in 1855, when the Heally Club played a United All-England Eleven. A single first-class match was held there when the North played the South in the North v South match of 1866, The match ended in a draw, despite the South's Edgar Willsher taking 6 for 71 in the North's first-innings. By 1867 cricket had ceased to be played at the ground, with an advert appearing in the Rochdale Observer encouraging people to buy shares in a proposed bowling green that was to replace the ground. This proposal eventually come to fruition, with the Castleton Bowling Club still in existence on the same site to this day.

References

External links
Merefield Cricket Ground on Cricinfo

Defunct cricket grounds in England
Buildings and structures in Rochdale
Sport in Rochdale
Cricket grounds in Greater Manchester
Defunct sports venues in Greater Manchester
Sports venues completed in 1855
1867 disestablishments in England